Bieńkówka  is a village in the administrative district of Gmina Chełmno, within Chełmno County, Kuyavian-Pomeranian Voivodeship, in north-central Poland, on the right bank of the Vistula river. It is located in the Chełmno Land in the historic region of Pomerania.

History
During the German occupation (World War II), in 1939, local Polish teachers were murdered by the Germans in a massacre of Poles committed in nearby Klamry as part of the Intelligenzaktion. In 1941, the occupiers also carried out expulsions of Poles, whose farms were then handed over to German colonists as part of the Lebensraum policy.

References

Populated places on the Vistula
Villages in Chełmno County